Sugarloaf Knob is a well-known summit within Ohiopyle State Park on the south end of the Laurel Ridge. This mountain has a unique profile and can easily be recognized at different lookouts in the park and surrounding area.

Sugarloaf Knob is easily accessible by a park road which takes you to just below the summit. A short bushwhack from there will get you to the top of the mountain.

References

 

Mountains of Pennsylvania
Allegheny Mountains
Landforms of Fayette County, Pennsylvania